is a Japanese footballer who plays for Roasso Kumamoto.

Club statistics
Updated to 23 February 2018.

References

External links

Profile at Roasso Kumamoto

1993 births
Living people
Hannan University alumni
Association football people from Kumamoto Prefecture
People from Hitoyoshi, Kumamoto
Japanese footballers
J2 League players
Roasso Kumamoto players
Association football midfielders